In Ramsey theory, a set S of natural numbers is considered to be a large set if and only if Van der Waerden's theorem can be generalized to assert the existence of arithmetic progressions with common difference in S.  That is, S is large if and only if every finite partition of the natural numbers has a cell containing arbitrarily long arithmetic progressions having common differences in S.

Examples
The natural numbers are large. This is precisely the assertion of Van der Waerden's theorem.
The even numbers are large.

Properties
Necessary conditions for largeness include:
If S is large, for any natural number n, S must contain at least one multiple (equivalently, infinitely many multiples) of n. 
If  is large, it is not the case that sk≥3sk-1 for k≥ 2.

Two sufficient conditions are:
If S contains n-cubes for arbitrarily large n, then S is large.

The first sufficient condition implies that if S is a thick set, then S is large.

Other facts about large sets include:
If S is large and F is finite, then S – F is large.
 is large. 
If S is large,  is also large.
If  is large, then for any ,  is large.

2-large and k-large sets
A set is k-large, for a natural number k > 0, when it meets the conditions for largeness when the restatement of van der Waerden's theorem is concerned only with k-colorings. Every set is either large or k-large for some maximal k. This follows from two important, albeit trivially true, facts:
k-largeness implies (k-1)-largeness for k>1
k-largeness for all k implies largeness.

It is unknown whether there are 2-large sets that are not also large sets. Brown, Graham, and Landman (1999) conjecture that no such sets exists.

See also
Partition of a set

Further reading

External links
Mathworld: van der Waerden's Theorem

Basic concepts in set theory
Ramsey theory
Theorems in discrete mathematics